Jörg Hoffmann may refer to:

Jörg Hoffmann (luger) (born 1963), East German luger
Jörg Hoffmann (swimmer) (born 1970), former freestyle swimmer from Germany
Jörg Hofmann (trade unionist) (born 1956), German trade union leader